Spissøy or Spyssøya is an island in Bømlo municipality in Vestland county, Norway.  The  island lies at the confluence of the Stokksundet strait and the Hardangerfjorden.  The island of Bømlo lies to the northwest, the island of Moster lies to the southwest, the island of Otterøya lies to the southeast, and the island of Nautøya lies to the northeast.  Spyssøya is connected to the island of Bømlo by the Spissøy Bridge and to the island of Nautøya via the Bømla Bridge.  Permanent inhabitants on the small island were few until the bridges were built.  Since that time, the island's population has been increasing.

See also
List of islands of Norway

References

Islands of Vestland
Bømlo